The Racławice Panorama (Polish: Panorama Racławicka) is a monumental (15 × 114 meter) cycloramic painting depicting the Battle of Racławice, during the Kościuszko Uprising. It is located in Wrocław, Poland. The painting is one of only a few preserved relics of a genre of 19th-century mass culture, and the oldest in Poland. The panorama stands in a circular fashion and, with the viewer in the center, presents different scenes at various viewing angles. A special kind of perspective used in the painting and additional effects (lighting, artificial terrain) create a feeling of reality.

History 

The idea came from the painter Jan Styka in Lwów (currently known as Lviv) who invited battle-painter Wojciech Kossak to participate in the project. They were assisted by Ludwik Boller, Tadeusz Popiel, Zygmunt Rozwadowski, Teodor Axentowicz, Włodzimierz Tetmajer, Wincenty Wodzinowski and Michał Sozański.

The project was conceived as a patriotic commemoration of the 100th anniversary of the victorious Battle of Racławice, a famous episode of the Kościuszko Insurrection, a heroic but ultimately failed attempt to defend Polish independence. The battle was fought on 4 April 1794 between the insurrectionist force of regulars and peasant volunteers (armed with scythes) under Kościuszko (1746–1817) himself and the Russian army commanded by General Alexander Tormasov. For the nation which had lost its independence, the memory of this glorious victory was particularly important.

The General National Exhibition in Lviv, in 1894, offered an excellent opportunity to realize Styka's idea. Canvas, woven to order, was bought in Brussels, the specially built rotunda's iron structure (designed by Ludwik Ramułt) in Vienna. The rotunda, located in Stryjski Park in Lwów, was ready in July 1893. The huge panoramic painting was executed within 9 months, between August 1893 and May 1894. The official opening was on 5 June 1894. Since the very beginning, the Panorama of the Battle of Racławice attracted enormous attention and brought crowds of tourists to Lwów. On average 75 000 viewers visited it every year.

After World War II, the painting was brought to Wrocław (formerly Breslau in Germany) along with a part of the collection of the Ossoliński Institute. As under the communist regime, the subject was considered politically sensitive, the efforts to have the canvas restored and exhibited, undertaken by successive Volunteer Committees, were successful only after August 1980. Reopened on 14 June 1985, the major attraction of the old Lwów has immediately become the main tourist attraction of Wrocław. Here, contemporary viewers have an opportunity to participate in a unique illusionist spectacle. Today the panorama attracts around 400,000 visitors annually.

Notable visitors
Among the many guests who have visited the panorama are Pope John Paul II; Beatrix, the Queen of the Netherlands; and Czesław Miłosz, winner of the 1980 Nobel Prize for Literature. Franz Joseph I of Austria visited the Racławice panorama on 8 September 1894 and said, "Imposant. Es hat mich frappirt" ("Impressive. It has astonished me"). Archduke Charles, Duke of Teschen, said about this painting, "This is the most beautiful panorama I have ever seen."

Gallery

Bibliography 
 (Polish, English, German) Józef Piątek, Małgorzata Dolistowska, "Panorama racławicka", Wrocław 1988, 
 (Polish, English, German, French) Romuald Nowak "Panorama racławicka", Muzeum Narodowe we Wrocławiu 1999/2010, 
 (Polish) Magdalena Irek-Koszerna  "Panorama Racławicka piórem i pędzlem", Wydawnictwo Zet 2010 
 (Polish) Krystyna Tyszkowska "Panorama Racławicka : 90 lat niezwykłych dziejów", 
 (Polish) Józef Grabski "Mała Panorama Racławicka Wojciecha Kossaka i Jana Styki", 2002 IRSA Publishing House,  
 (Polish) Franciszek Ziejka, "Panorama Racławicka", Wydawnictwo: K.A.W. 1984,

See also
International Panorama Council

References

External links

the Wroclaw Municipality website – details of the "Panorama of the Battle of Racławice"

Polish art
Military art
Murals
1894 paintings
Cycloramas
Art museums and galleries in Poland
Museums in Wrocław
National museums of Poland
Registered museums in Poland
Art museums established in 1985
1985 establishments in Poland
Horses in art